Haplogroup H may refer to:

 Haplogroup H (mtDNA), i.e. human mitochondrial DNA 
 Haplogroup H (Y-DNA), i.e. human Y-chromosome DNA